Midwest Sports Fans is a weblog, which was launched by Jerod Morris in August 2008. The site primarily focuses on professional and college teams and athletes relevant to the Midwest.

They receive approximately 600,000 pageviews each month, and is a part of the Yardbarker network, which links daily pieces to Fox Sports homepage

Authors and Content 
Jerod Morris is the Managing Editor and AJ Kaufman serves as Co-editor.  The author list for Midwest Sports Fans has included sports anchors Scott Reister (KNDU-TV in Kennewick, WA) and Candice Crawford (KOMU-TV in Columbia, MO).  Reister wrote a regular column called "The Anchor’s Desk", while Crawford regularly contributed her article, "From the Sideline.".  Other writers include "KVB," Kurt Allen, Jon Washburn, Tyler Juranovich, Devon Alexandre and Drew Lange.  MSF also has a podcast.

Controversy 
In a post titled, "The Curious Case of Raúl Ibañez: Steroid Speculation Perhaps Unfair, but Great Start in 2009 Raising Eyebrows,"  Morris outlined a variety of possible statistical explanations for the impressive beginning Raúl Ibañez got off to in 2009, his first year with the Philadelphia Phillies. In the post, Morris argues that because of Major League Baseball’s sordid recent history with performance-enhancing drug (PED) use, it is reasonable to speculate and impossible to rule out that Ibáñez’s could be steroid enhanced.  In the post, Morris stated that he was withholding judgment on the issue and later clarified that he did not believe Ibanez was using steroids, only that such speculation is warranted for any Major League Baseball Player.

The post on Midwest Sports Fans created a controversy when it was mentioned by John Gonzalez in a "Philadelphia Inquirer" article entitled "A cheap shot at Ibanez". Morris claimed that Gonzalez had mischaracterized the post. Once informed of the Philadelphia Inquirer article by Gonzalez that discussed the post by Morris, Raúl Ibañez criticized the post saying he considered it "pathetic" and "cowardly" and vowing that he would go to any measure to prove that he is clean.

On the same day that Ibanez's comments became public, Morris, Gonzalez, and Ken Rosenthal of Fox Sports appeared on the ESPN show, "Outside the Lines," hosted by Steve Bunin.

References

American sport websites
Internet properties established in 2008